The Taipei Metro Sanmin Senior High School station is a station on the Luzhou Line located in Luzhou, New Taipei, Taiwan.

Station overview

The two-level, underground station is located at the intersection of Sanmin Rd. and Fuxing Rd. and opened on 3 November 2010 with the opening of the Luzhou Line. It served over 14,000 passengers per day within two weeks of opening, and has the second-highest daily ridership on the Luzhou Line by the end of November 2010 at 25,433 passengers per day (after Luzhou).

Construction
Excavation depth for the station is around 26 meters. The station is 193 meters in length and 22 meters in width with two entrances, an elevator for the disabled, and two vent shafts. Because of geological features of the area (sand deposits resulting in weak ground), reinforcing structures were enlarged for safety considerations.

Station Design
The theme for the station is "At Home in the Water", as part of a common theme of egrets for the Luzhou Line. Vent shafts form images of nests and hills.

Station layout

Exits
Exit 1: Sanmin Rd.
Exit 2: Fuxing Rd.

Around the station
Luzhou City Office
Sanmin Senior High School
Luzhou Elementary School
Lujiang Elementary School
National Open University

References

Zhonghe–Xinlu line stations
Railway stations opened in 2010